Bird Lives! is an album by trumpeter Red Rodney featuring performances of tunes by, or associated with, Charlie Parker which was recorded in 1973 and released on the Muse label.

Reception

The AllMusic review by Scott Yanow stated "This was trumpeter Red Rodney's first jazz date as a leader in 14 years. In the interim, he had spent a lot of time playing in show bands in Las Vegas, and both his chops and his jazz abilities were a bit out of practice, but making a gradual comeback ... Although Rodney was not yet back in top form, McPherson and Harris are quite consistent, and the overall date has its share of strong moments".

Track listing
All compositions by Charlie Paker except where noted
 "Big Foot" – 5:28
 "I'll Remember April" (Gene de Paul, Patricia Johnston, Don Raye) – 11:11
 "Donna Lee" – 6:44
 "Chasin' the Bird" – 9:22
 "'Round Midnight" (Thelonious Monk, Cootie Williams, Bernie Hanighen) – 12:46
 "52nd Street Theme" (Monk) – 5:48

Personnel
Red Rodney – trumpet
Charles McPherson – alto saxophone
Barry Harris – piano
Sam Jones – bass
Roy Brooks – drums

References

Muse Records albums
Red Rodney albums
1973 albums
Albums produced by Don Schlitten
Charlie Parker tribute albums